Speed – The Ride is a roller coaster in storage at Akita Plaza on the Las Vegas Strip in Nevada. Originally located at the Sahara Hotel and Casino, it opened to the public on April 28, 2000, and closed on May 1, 2011.

History

NASCAR Café (2000–2012)
Speed – The Ride was constructed during the Sahara Hotel and Casino's 1999 remodeling, as part of the NASCAR Café addition. The ride was designed and manufactured by Premier Rides and fabricated by Intermountain Lift, Inc.

The Sahara casino closed on May 16, 2011. The outdated resort had been suffering from decline and lack of upkeep in prior years. Speed – The Ride ceased operation prior to the hotel's closure on May 1, 2011. Dismantling of the coaster began in April 2012.

Akita Plaza
According to the contractor dismantling the ride, Speed will be reinstalled at Akita Plaza, a small shopping center across the street from Mandalay Bay, which also plans to add new restaurants and a concert venue. The Akita Plaza development later stalled, and Speed – The Ride remained dismantled and in storage at the site. By 2019, a portion of the ride was recycled for scrap.

Ride experience
The train dropped into an underground tunnel in front of the resort and then passed through a  vertical loop. After a quick snaking turn, the train traveled up a 224-ft (68m) tower before falling and traversing the entire course backwards. On the return trip, the second launch area decelerated the train from  before traveling back through the vertical loop and the underground tunnel. The train then reached the final brake run and returned to the station.

See also
 2011 in amusement parks

References

External links

Speed-The Ride

Roller coasters in the Las Vegas Valley
Roller coasters introduced in 2000
Amusement rides that closed in 2011
Former roller coasters in Nevada
Roller coasters introduced in 2014
2000 establishments in Nevada